The 1989–90 DDR-Oberliga season was the 42nd and final season of the DDR-Oberliga, the top level of ice hockey in East Germany. Two teams participated in the league, and SG Dynamo Weißwasser won the championship.

Participating teams

Standings

Game results

1st series

2nd series

3rd series

4th series

Dynamo Weißwasser overall won series 3–1

Statistics

References

External links
East German results 1970-1990

1989-90
Ger
Oberliga
1989 in East German sport
1990 in East German sport